H-S Precision Pro 2000 HTR ("heavy tactical rifle") is a bolt-action sniper rifle. It was designed and manufactured by the American company H-S Precision, Inc. The rifle is very accurate: 0.8 minute of angle with 7.62×51mm NATO, about 0.4 minute of angle with match grade ammunition and about 0.15 minute of angle with custom handloads.

History

The Israeli Defense Forces adopted an improved version of this rifle, as their long-range sniper rifle and named it "Barak". The contracts called for providing a Leupold Mark IV rings, a McCann rail mount system, a Hardigg hard case, an infrared target illuminator, five seven round mags, a Harris bipod, a detachable muzzle brake, a cleaning/maintenance kit, and a Tripod Data Systems PDA running the Horus Vision ballistic software alongside a suppressor and night vision systems.

In 2012, the IDF mentioned that several of the Baraks underwent modifications under the supervision of Ashbury due to the need of finding suitable ammo.

Design
The Barak is chambered .338 Lapua Magnum with a 28-inch (711 mm) barrel and can achieve accuracy of 0.5-0.25 minute of angle with IMI match grade 250 grain ammunition. 

Users

 : Used by the IDF.
 : Used by the FBI.

References

Bolt-action rifles of the United States
Sniper rifles of the United States
.338 Lapua Magnum rifles